Statistics of UAE Football League for the 1994–95 season.

Overview
It was contested by 10 teams, and Al-Shabab (United Arab Emirates) won the championship.

League standings

References
United Arab Emirates - List of final tables (RSSSF)

UAE Pro League seasons
United
1994–95 in Emirati football